The first season of the Australian drama television series The Time of Our Lives, began airing on 16 June 2013 on ABC. The season concluded on 8 September 2013. The season consisted of 13 episodes and aired on Sundays at 8:30pm.

Production 
On 2 July 2012, the ABC announced a new drama project from JAHM Productions named The Time of Our Lives, a thirteen-part drama series by Amanda Higgs and Judi McCrossin – the co-creator and the principal writer of The Secret Life of Us. Filming for season one began on 29 June 2012 and wrapped in September 2012

Cast

Main 
 Justine Clarke as Bernadette Tivolli
 Shane Jacobson as Luce Tivolli
 William McInnes as Matt Tivolli
 Stephen Curry as Herb Ireland
 Michelle Vergara Moore as Chai Li Tivolli
 Claudia Karvan as Caroline Tivolli

Recurring 
 Tony Barry as Ray Tivolli
 Sue Jones as Rosa Tivolli
 Anita Hegh as Maryanne
 Cheree Cassidy as Alice

Guest 
 Alex Papps as Tom Reid
 Tina Bursill as Lenore
 Damian Walshe-Howling as Ewan
 Thomas Fisher as Carmody Tivolli
 Elise MacDougall as Georgie Flynn
 Frances McGahey as Frances Tivolli
 Tully McGahey as Tully Tivolli

Episodes 

{| class="wikitable plainrowheaders" style="margin: auto; width: 100%"
|-
!! style="background-color:#973A23; color: #fff; text-align: center;" width=5%|No. inseries
!! style="background-color:#973A23; color: #fff; text-align: center;" width=5%|No. inseason
!! style="background-color:#973A23; color: #fff; text-align: center;" width=20%|Title
!! style="background-color:#973A23; color: #fff; text-align: center;" width=10%|Directed by
!! style="background-color:#973A23; color: #fff; text-align: center;" width=20%|Written by
!! style="background-color:#973A23; color: #fff; text-align: center;" width=10%|Original air date
!! style="background-color:#973A23; color: #fff; text-align: center;" width=10%|Australian viewers
|-

|}

References 

2013 Australian television seasons